Ali Assadalla Qambar (born 19 January 1993), also known simply as Ali Asad, is a Qatari footballer who currently plays for Al Sadd as a midfielder. He also currently plays for the Qatar national team.

International career
Assadalla was born in Bahrain, but was raised and naturalized as Qatari. Assaddi was called up the Qatar B team on 13 November 2013. He made official debut for the team on 25 December in the 2014 WAFF Championship in a 1–0 win against Palestine. He played in all of Qatar's matches in the tournament, scoring a goal against Kuwait during extra time in the semi final. He formed a prolific partnership with Boualem Khoukhi, who won the top scorer award, throughout the tournament. This culminated in his team defeating Jordan in the finals and claiming its maiden WAFF title, in addition to Asad being declared 'Best Player of the Tournament'.

International goals
Scores and results list Qatar's goal tally first.

Honours

Club
Al-Sadd
 Qatar Stars League: 2012–13, 2018–19, 2020–21, 2021–22
 Qatar Cup: 2017, 2020, 2021
 Emir of Qatar Cup: 2014, 2015, 2017, 2020, 2021
 Qatari Stars Cup: 2010, 2019-20
 Sheikh Jassim Cup: 2014, 2017, 2019
 AFC Champions League: 2011
 FIFA Club World Cup Third-place: 2011

International
Qatar B
WAFF Championship (1): 2014

Qatar
Gulf Cup of Nations (1): 2014

Individual
WAFF Championship MVP: 2014

References

External links
 
 
 
 

1993 births
Living people
Al Sadd SC players
Qatari footballers
Qatar international footballers
Bahraini footballers
Bahraini emigrants to Qatar
Qatar Stars League players
2015 AFC Asian Cup players
Footballers at the 2010 Asian Games
Sportspeople from Manama
Naturalised citizens of Qatar
Association football midfielders
Asian Games competitors for Bahrain
Qatar under-20 international footballers
Qatar youth international footballers
2022 FIFA World Cup players